The Roman Catholic Diocese of Ostrava-Opava is a suffragan Latin diocese in the Ecclesiastical province of the Archdiocese of Olomouc in Moravskoslezský kraj, Moravia, in the Czech Republic.

The cathedral episcopal see is Katedrála Božského Spasitele, dedicated to the Divine Saviour, in Ostrava, and it also has
 a Co-Cathedral, the Konkatedrála Nanebevzetí Panny Marie, in Opava, dedicated to the Virgin Mary
 a Minor Basilica: Bazilika Navštívení Panny Marie, in Frýdek-Místek, dedicated to the Virgin Mary

History 
 Established on May 30, 1996 as Diocese of Ostrava–Opava / Ostravien(sis)–Opavien(sis) (Latin), on territory split off from its Metropolitan, the Archdiocese of Olomouc, which territory was part until 1978 of the then Diocese of Wroclaw (Breslau, Poland) while that comprised all Silesia.

Statistics 
As per 2014, it pastorally served 429,300 Catholics (32.7% of 1,314,000 total) on  6,150 km² in 276 parishes and a mission with 247 priests (188 diocesan, 59 religious), 30 deacons, 218 lay religious (76 brothers, 142 sisters) and 8 seminarians.

Episcopate 
(all Roman rite)

Suffragan Bishops of Ostrava-Opava 
 František Václav Lobkowicz, Norbertines (O. Praem.) (30 May 1996 - 17 February 2022), a Prince (by birth) of the Lobkowicz family, Vice-President of Czech Bishops’ Conference (2005.01 – 2010.04.21); previously Titular Bishop of Catabum Castra (1990.03.17 – 1996.05.30) as Auxiliary Bishop of Archdiocese of Praha (Prague, Czech Republic) (1990.03.17 – 1996.05.30)
 Auxiliary bishop : Martin David (2017.04.07 – ...), Titular Bishop of Thucca in Numidia (2017.04.07 – ...).

See also
 List of Catholic dioceses in the Czech Republic
 Roman Catholicism in the Czech Republic

Sources 
 GCatholic.org, with Google mapa & satellite photo - data for all sections
 Catholic Hierarchy
 Diocese website

Roman Catholic dioceses in the Czech Republic
Christian organizations established in 1996
Ostrava
Roman Catholic dioceses and prelatures established in the 20th century